Housane or bicyclo[2.1.0]pentane is a saturated cycloalkane with the formula C5H8. It is a colorless volatile liquid at room temperature. It was named "housane" because of its shape. Structurally, the molecule consists of cyclopropane fused to cyclobutane.  The synthesis of molecules containing multiple strained rings, such as housane, is a traditional endeavor in synthetic organic chemistry.

Preparation 
The first synthesis of housane was reported by Criegee in 1957, where housane was obtained from the pyrolysis of 2,3-diazabicyclo[2.2.1]hept-2-ene. 

Housane can be prepared in several steps starting with cyclopentadiene. Other methods include photolysis of 2,3-diazabicyclo[2.2.1]hept-2-ene, pyrolysis of N-Phenyl-2-oxo-3-azabicyclo[2.2.1]heptane, and addition of methylene to cyclobutene.

Structure and properties 
The two rings are fused in a cis configuration—this meso compound formally has (1R,4S) absolute stereochemistry. The small size of the two rings prevents the trans isomer from existing, so the stereochemistry is not usually mentioned when discussing this structure.

Housane is easily attacked by bromine or iodine. In the presence of a platinum catalyst at room temperature, it is hydrogenated to cyclopentane. Reaction with hydrogen bromide at lower temperatures affords bromocyclopentane. Housane also reacts with lead tetraacetate, forming cis-1,3-diacetoxycyclopentane among other products.

Housane is thermally quite stable, isomerizing to cyclopentene at 330 °C.

References

Cyclobutanes
Hydrocarbons
Cyclopropanes
Bicycloalkanes